Jeffrey McDonald Chandor (born November 24, 1973), better known as J. C. Chandor, is an American filmmaker, best known for writing and directing the films Margin Call (2011), All Is Lost (2013), A Most Violent Year (2014), Triple Frontier (2019) and Kraven the Hunter (2023).

Early life and education
Chandor grew up in the Basking Ridge section of Bernards Township, New Jersey. He is the son of Mary (McDonald) and Jeff Chandor, an investment banker. After graduating in 1992 from Ridge High School in Bernards Township, he received his bachelor's degree in 1996 from The College of Wooster. During the 15 years leading up to Margin Call, Chandor directed commercials.

Film career
Margin Call was Chandor's first feature-length film. The film premiered at the 2011 Sundance Film Festival in Park City, Utah; it also played In Competition at the 61st Berlin International Film Festival and was nominated for the Golden Bear. Margin Call was nominated for four Independent Spirit Awards and won two of them: for Best First Feature and the Robert Altman Award for Best Cast. Chandor was also nominated for the Academy Award for Best Original Screenplay.

His second feature film All Is Lost was screened Out of Competition at the 2013 Cannes Film Festival. It received critical acclaim, especially for Robert Redford's solo performance which featured almost no dialogue, for which Redford won the New York Film Critics Circle Award for Best Actor, and was nominated for the Golden Globe Award and Critics' Choice Award. The film was also nominated for an Academy Award for Best Sound Editing.

In 2014, Chandor directed Oscar Isaac and Jessica Chastain in A Most Violent Year which was nominated for a Golden Globe and Independent Spirit Award and which won three National Board of Review awards: Best Actor, Best Supporting Actress, and Best Picture for Chandor and his producing partners Neal Dodson and Anna Gerb.

In 2015, Chandor replaced Kathryn Bigelow as director for the crime film Triple Frontier. The film was released on Netflix in March 2019 to generally favorable reviews. In 2017, he signed a first look deal with Gaumont.

In 2020, it was announced that Chandor would direct a film Kraven the Hunter for Sony’s Spider-Man Universe.

Chandor runs the production company CounterNarrative Films with producers Neal Dodson and Anna Gerb in New York City. They have dozens of projects in various stages of development for film and television.

Filmography

Producer
 The Con Is On (2018)
 Viper Club (2018)

Executive producer
 Monos (2019)
 Run This Town (2019)

References

External links

Living people
American male screenwriters
College of Wooster alumni
Ridge High School alumni
People from Bernards Township, New Jersey
1973 births
Film directors from New Jersey
Advertising directors
Best Screenplay AACTA International Award winners
Film producers from New Jersey
Screenwriters from New Jersey